The NCAT Pavement Test Track is an oval-shaped track in Lee County, Alabama,  long, used for testing experimental asphalt pavements. It is managed by the National Center for Asphalt Technology (NCAT), the largest asphalt research center in the western hemisphere and a cooperative venture between the National Asphalt Pavement Association's (NAPA) Research and Education Foundation and Auburn University.

In 2003, the project was inducted into the Alabama Engineering Hall of Fame following the initial 2000 research cycle. The track has continued operations in subsequent research cycles.

References

External links 
 NCAT Pavement Test Track
 National Center for Asphalt Technology

Industrial buildings and structures in Alabama
Buildings and structures in Lee County, Alabama
Road test tracks
Auburn University